Lawrence Pressman (born David M. Pressman; July 10, 1939) is an American actor, probably best known for roles on Doogie Howser, M.D., Ladies' Man, a recurring role on Profiler, the title character on Mulligan's Stew and as a fictional scientist in the 1971 film The Hellstrom Chronicle.

His first role was on the soap opera The Edge of Night, and one of his first movie starring roles was in Shaft (1971). His other film credits include Making It (1971), The Crazy World of Julius Vrooder (1974), The Man in the Glass Booth (1975), 9 to 5 (1980), The Hanoi Hilton (1987), Angus (1995), Trial and Error (1997), Very Bad Things (1998), Mighty Joe Young (1998) and American Pie (1999). He played Col. Cathcart in the Hanoi Hilton.

He has appeared in TV movies such as The Gathering, A Fighting Choice, The Late Shift, Whose Daughter Is She?, Victims for Victims: The Theresa Saldana Story, as well as in guest roles on Hawaii Five-O, Paper Moon, The Bob Newhart Show, The Mary Tyler Moore Show, Griff, Dawson's Creek, The Drew Carey Show, Providence, The Practice, Dangerous Minds, Diagnosis: Murder, Law & Order, Matlock, Ghost Whisperer, Marcus Welby, M.D., Gilmore Girls, Murder, She Wrote, M*A*S*H, Star Trek: Deep Space Nine, and Cannon.

Pressman played Bill Denton in the 1976 miniseries Rich Man, Poor Man. He portrayed H. R. Haldeman in the 1979 CBS miniseries Blind Ambition, and also appeared in the 1983 mini-series The Winds of War.

Filmography

 The Hellstrom Chronicle (film) (1971) as Dr Hellstrom
 Making It (1971) as Mallory
 Cannon (premier) (TV - 1971) as Herb Mayer
 Shaft (1971) as Tom Hannon
 6 Rms Riv Vu (TV - 1974) as Richard Miller
 Winter Kills (TV - 1974) as Peter Lockhard 
 The Crazy World of Julius Vrooder (1974) as Passki
 The Man in the Glass Booth (1975) as Charlie Cohn
 The First 36 Hours of Dr. Durant (TV - 1975) as Dr. Konrad Zane
 Everybody Rides the Carousel (1975) Stage 7 Voice
 The Trial of Lee Harvey Oswald (TV - 1977) as Paul Ewbank
 The Gathering (TV - 1977) as Tom
 Like Mom, Like Me (TV - 1978) as Michael Gruen
 Walk Proud (1979) as Henry Lassiter
 The Gathering, Part II (TV - 1979) as Tom
 9 to 5 (1980) as Dick
 Cry for the Strangers (TV - 1982) as Glen Palmer
 Rehearsal for Murder (TV - 1982) as Lloyd Andrews
 The Red-Light Sting (TV - 1982) as Larry Barton
 The Three Wishes of Billy Grier (TV - 1984) as Frank
 Victims for Victims: The Theresa Saldana Story (TV - 1984) as Dr. Stein
 For Love or Money (TV - 1984) as Herb
 The Deliberate Stranger (TV - 1986) as Ken Wolverton
 The Hanoi Hilton (1987) as Col. Catheart
 Little Girl Lost (1988) as Lester
 Honor Bound (1988) as Maxwell
 She Knows Too Much (TV - 1989) as Robert Hughes
 Breaking Point (TV - 1989) as Gen. Smith
 Fire and Rain (TV - 1989) as Mr. Hamilton
 White Hot: The Mysterious Murder of Thelma Todd (TV - 1991) as Roland West
 To My Daughter with Love (TV - 1994) as Arthur Monroe
 The Enemy Within (TV - 1994) as Atty. General Arthur Daniels
 Star Trek, Deep Space Nine: Second Skin (TV - 1994) as Legate Tekeny Ghemor 
 The Rockford Files: I Still Love L. A. (TV - 1994) as Kornblum
 Angus (1995) as Principal Metcalf
 Whose Daughter Is She? (TV - 1995) as Dr. Joe Steiner
 A Case for Life (TV - 1996) as Cardiac
 The Late Shift (TV - 1996) as Bob Wright
 The Sunchaser (1996) as FBI Agent-In-Charge Collier
 She Cried No (1996) as Edward Connell
 The Uninvited (TV - 1996) as Winston
 Trial and Error (1997) as Whitfield
 The Maker (1997) as Father Minnell
 My Giant (1998) as Doctor
 Very Bad Things (1998) as Mr. Fisher
 Mighty Joe Young (1998) as Dr. Baker
 American Pie (1999) as Coach Marshall
 Sex and a Girl aka Alex in Wonder (2001) as School Counselor
 Dr. Dolittle 2 (2001) as Governor of California
 American Wedding (2003) as Head Coach
 DC 9/11: Time of Crisis (TV - 2003) as Vice President Dick Cheney
 Murder Without Conviction (TV - 2004) as Dr. G. K. Sanderson
 Nine Lives (2005) as Roman
 Fathers and Sons (TV - 2005) as Max's Father
 American Dreamz (2006) as White House Butler
 Mentor (2006) as Jonathan Kendall
 The Far Side of Jericho (2006) as Van Damm
 Tickling Leo (2009) as Warren Pikler
 Mother and Child (2009) as Dr. Morgan
 Criminal Minds (2009) as Jude Schuller
 Beyond the Heavens (2013) as Pastor Jim
 Totem (2017) as Bernard
 9-1-1 (TV - 2018) as Mitchell
 Reboot (TV - 2022) as Jerry

References

External links

1939 births
Living people
American male film actors
American male television actors
People from Cynthiana, Kentucky
Male actors from Kentucky
20th-century American male actors
21st-century American male actors
American male soap opera actors